John Cledwyn Hughes (1920–1978), who wrote under the name Cledwyn Hughes, was an Anglo-Welsh writer of novels, children's books, and literary-topographical books about Wales. He was also a prolific short-story writer who was published in a wide range of popular and literary magazines including The New Yorker, Argosy and Woman and Home.

The Oxford Companion to the Literature of Wales cites The Civil Strangers (Phoenix House, 1950) as his most distinguished work and notes the fineness of his topographical writing, and of his writing for children.

Hughes was born at Llansantffraid-ym-Mechain in Montgomeryshire, and died at Arthog, Merionethshire, where he and his wife Alyna lived from 1947. An archive of his papers is held at the National Library of Wales.

Major works

Novels 
The Different Drummer and The Inn Closes for Christmas: two novels (Pilot Press, 1947)
Wennon (Pilot Press, 1948)
The Civil Strangers (Phoenix House, 1950)
After the Holiday (Phoenix House, 1950)
The House in the Cornfield - semi-autobiographical (Werner Laurie, 1957)

Topographical writing 
A Wanderer in North Wales (Phoenix House, 1949)
The Northern Marches (Robert Hale, 1953)
Poaching down the Dee (Robert Hale, 1953)
Royal Wales (Phoenix House, 1957)
West with the Tinkers (Odham Press, 1951)
Portrait of Snowdonia (Robert Hale, 1967)
The Batsford Colour Book of Wales (Batsford, 1975)

Children's books 
 Gold and "The Moonspray" (Heinemann, 1953)
 The King Who Lived on Jelly (Routledge and Kegan Paul,1961)

Other Full-Length Works 
 Leonard Cheshire V. C. (Phoenix House, 1961)
 Ponies for Children (Routledge and Kegan Paul, 1962)
 Making an Orchard (Land Books, 1961)

International and Translated Editions 
 He Dared not Look Behind (A A Wyn, 1949) – Title under which 'The Inn Closes for Christmas was published' in USA and Canada
 La Jambe de Cain (Gallimard, 1963) – French edition of the above
 The King Who Lived on Jelly (Special Edition, Georgian House, Melbourne, Australia, 1969)

Short Stories and Broadcast Works 
Over 250 short stories are known to have been published by Cledwyn Hughes. The first recorded published story being in 1943 ('Their Secret Sorrows' in the Weekly Telegraph). The manuscripts of the majority of stories are available to researchers in the National Library of Wales archives.

Stories Published 1943-1949

Stories Published 1950-1959

Stories published 1960-1973

Broadcast Works 

 "Charles Macintosh" - BBC Children's Hour

 "The Basket"- BBC Midlands/Wales

 "The Black Horse" - BBC French Service

 "Watkins and the Fairies", - BBC Children's Hour

 "Geekie's First Christmas" - BBC Children's Hour

 "Geekie's Wonderful Christmas" - BBC Children's Hour

 "Pritchard's Bees" - BBC, The Wednesday Story

 "Salty Jones" - BBC Midland Home Service and internationally

 "The Leaf which Never Died" - BBC Children's Hour

 "Grower of Lavender and Professor of Magic" - BBC Norwegian Service

 "The Curious Captain of the Golden Rhubarb" - BBC Children's Xmas Morning story read by Norman Shelley)

 "November Day" - Welsh Home Service

 "The Church by the Sea"  with Donald Huston - BBC Home Service, Welsh

 "Seasons in Powys" - BBC Home Service Welsh
 "Spring Comes to Wales"  with Donald Huston - BBC Home Service
 "The Eternal Goddess"  - BBC Welsh Home Service 
 "Winter Estuary"  - BBC Welsh Home Service 
 "The Lamb with the Tongue of Gold" - BBC Children's Hour 
 "The Gramophone with the Green Horn: A story of the open road"  and  - BBC Saturday Matinee 
 "A Song Before Winter"  with Carleton Hobbs - BBC Home Service 
 "A School by the Rose Garden"  - produced by Wilbert Lloyd Roberts Welsh Home Service and Home Service 
 "Christmas near a Green Mountain"  - BBC Wales Home Service 
 "Johnny's Miracle" - BBC Morning Story 
 "The Green Eye in the Window" - BBC Morning Story 
 "Jericho and the Jumble Sale"  with Dillwyn wen - BBC Morning Story 
 "Taking a Bird on Honeymoon" - BBC Morning Story 
 "The Old Strollers' Carol Party" - South African Broadcasting Corporation

Critical response and legacy 
Hughes's writing had an international reach and received attention in a wide range of literary and popular publications. His writing is described in contemporary reviews as poetic, showing whimsy and melancholia, or at times a darker sentiment. The Spectator (7 February 1947) welcomed the first longer works by Hughes (The Inn Closes for Christmas and The Different Drummer) describing them as 'Two vivid short novels by a brilliant young Welshman whose short stories have already established his reputation'.

References 

Anglo-Welsh writers
20th-century British short story writers
1920 births
1978 deaths